Karl Thorsten Gunnar Andersson (29 February 1923 – 4 April 2018) was a Swedish toponymist, and a former Professor of Linguistics at Uppsala University.

Biography
Karl Thorsten Gunnar Andersson was born in Ödeshög Municipality, Sweden on 29 February 1923. He was an associate professor of Swedish at the University of Münster from 1957 to 1960. Andersson received his PhD from Uppsala University in 1965, where he subsequently became a docent in Nordic languages. From 1971 to 1994, Andersson was Professor of Linguistics at Uppsala University.

Andersson specialized in toponymy. He was the publisher of Namn och bygd and co-publisher of Studia Anthroponymica Scandinavica. He was the author of a large number of books and articles on Swedish place names and personal names. Andersson was a member of the Royal Society of the Humanities at Uppsala, the Royal Gustavus Adolphus Academy, the Royal Danish Academy of Sciences and Letters, the Royal Swedish Academy of Letters, History and Antiquities and the Royal Norwegian Society of Sciences and Letters. He died on 4 April 2018.

Selected works
 Svenska häradsnamn, 1965
 Namn i Norden och det forna Europa, 1989

References

External links

1923 births
2018 deaths
Germanic studies scholars
Linguists from Sweden
Linguists of Germanic languages
Members of the Royal Danish Academy of Sciences and Letters
Members of the Royal Gustavus Adolphus Academy
People from Ödeshög Municipality
Royal Norwegian Society of Sciences and Letters
Toponymists
Academic staff of the University of Münster
Academic staff of Uppsala University